The 2005 Giro d'Italia was the 88th edition of the cycle race, one of cycling's Grand Tours. The Giro began in Reggio Calabria with a prologue individual time trial on 7 May, and Stage 10 occurred on 18 May with a flat stage to Rossano Veneto. The race finished in Milan on 29 May.

Prologue 
7 May 2005 — Reggio Calabria,  (ITT)

The prologue was a  individual time trial. It was won by the Australian Brett Lancaster with a 0.289 second advantage over Matteo Tosatto, who scored second. After the last rider, Mario Cipollini received the homage of the Italian cycling world, doing the 1.15 kilometer race out of competition. He had announced his retirement just ten days before.

Stage 1 
8 May 2005 — Reggio Calabria to Tropea, 

At the beginning of the first stage, a four-man breakaway formed and led by almost ten minutes at one point. Thorwald Veneberg was finally captured again about 20 kilometers before the end. However, his efforts paid by giving him the first maglia Verde of the Giro. On the last kilometer Paolo Bettini managed to get away on a very steep gradient.

Stage 2 
9 May 2005 — Catanzaro Lido to Santa Maria del Cedro, 

Having been defeated by Paolo Bettini and Robbie McEwen on the previous stage, Italian favorite Alessandro Petacchi failed yet again in the bunch sprint in Santa Maria Del Cedro. This time, he claimed, he had been forced to change his direction because of Estonian Jaan Kirsipuu.

Stage 3 
10 May 2005 — Diamante to Giffoni Valle Piana, 

Just as in the first stage, the sprinter's teams were not able to stop a breakaway in the last kilometers of the race. This time, it was a group of fifty riders which included all the GC important riders. Danilo DI Luca, in a great form in season 2005, beat fellow Italian Damiano Cunego in the sprint for the stage victory.

Stage 4 
11 May 2005 — Giffoni Valle Piana to Frosinone, 

Paolo Bettini won the sprint at the end which was fought between five cyclists. But in this process he caused Baden Cooke to fall and was declassified because of this. Luca Mazzanti, who came in second, inherited the victory. After the stage, Bettini threatened to abandon the race, but it turned out to be an empty threat.

Stage 5 
12 May 2005 — Celano to L'Aquila, 

Danilo DI Luca got his second stage victory in 2005 Giro d'Italia, notching this win ahead of Fassa Bortolo's Marzio Bruseghin. Otherwise, this stage had no important influence on the fight for General Classification.

Stage 6 
13 May 2005 — Viterbo to Marina di Grosseto, 

Just as Danilo DI Luca had done the previous day, Australian Robbie McEwen took his second win in this year's Giro. This time, he did not have to beat Alessandro Petacchi, since the Italian's Torino biancoblù de-railed, causing the fall of some of the Fassa Bortolo riders, and forcing "Ale-Jet" to halt to a stop. McEwen's teammate Henk Vogels attacked in the last kilometer, but was surpassed just at the finish line by up to four other cyclists.

Stage 7 
14 May 2005 — Grosseto to Pistoia, 

After a long breakaway, lasting throughout most of the stage, Spaniard Koldo Gil was the first to arrive at the finish line in Pistoia. Damiano Cunego, who was second, leading a pursuing group, celebrated thinking he had won the stage, not knowing that Gil had already taken the victory. Ivan Basso, who had been forced to change his bicycle because of a puncture in the last climb of the day, lost thirty seconds to his rivals for GC.

Stage 8 
15 May 2005 — Lamporecchio to Florence,  (ITT)

The eighth stage was a time trial. Danilo DI Luca came in tenth and was able to keep the Maglia Rosa. Otherwise, this stage meant the victory for American David Zabriskie, and the revival of his teammate Ivan Basso, second in the time trial, and who made up for all the time he had lost the day before and even more. On the other hand, this was a very bad day for both Lampre riders  Damiano Cunego and Gilberto Simoni.

Stage 9 
16 May 2005 — Florence to Ravenna, 

Alessandro Petacchi got his first victory in the 2005 Giro. Paolo Bettini and Swiss Aurélien Clerc had a great performance at this stage, surpassing pure sprinters such as Robbie McEwen or Erik Zabel.

Stage 10 
18 May 2005 — Ravenna to Rossano Veneto, 

On the stage after the race's first rest day, Robbie McEwen took vengeance on Alessandro Petacchi in a bunch sprint. The bunch spring had to be solved with the aid of the photo-finish, which determined that the Australian had beaten the Italian by a mere question of millimeters.

References 

2005 Giro d'Italia
Giro d'Italia stages